Semoy Kee-Ann Hackett (born 27 November 1988) is a Tobagonian track and field sprint athlete who competed collegiately at Louisiana State University. Her personal best in the 100m is 11.09, and 22.49 in 200m.

Hackett represented Trinidad and Tobago at the 2008 Summer Olympics in Beijing. She competed at the 100 metres sprint and placed fourth in her first round heat, which normally meant elimination. However, her time of 11.53 seconds was among the ten fastest losing times and she qualified for the second round. There she failed to qualify for the semi finals as her time of 11.46 was the sixth time of her race. Together with Wanda Hutson, Ayanna Hutchinson and Kelly-Ann Baptiste she also took part in the 4x100 metres relay. In their first round heat they did not finish and were eliminated due to a mistake with the baton exchange.

Hackett ran a relay at the 2011 World Championships in Athletics, but was retrospectively disqualified and banned for six months because of a failed drugs test for Methylhexaneamine at the National Championships.

In November 2012, Louisiana State University reported that Hackett had again tested positive for methylhexaneamine at the 2012 NCAA Division I Outdoor Track & Field Championships in June. LSU was forced to vacate their national championship due to the failed drug test. Hackett was given a doping ban of two-year and four months. The ban ended 30 April 2015.

Achievements

References

External links
 
 
 

1988 births
Living people
Doping cases in athletics
Trinidad and Tobago sportspeople in doping cases
Trinidad and Tobago female sprinters
Olympic athletes of Trinidad and Tobago
Athletes (track and field) at the 2008 Summer Olympics
Athletes (track and field) at the 2012 Summer Olympics
Athletes (track and field) at the 2016 Summer Olympics
Athletes (track and field) at the 2018 Commonwealth Games
LSU Lady Tigers track and field athletes
Trinidad and Tobago female athletes
World Athletics Championships athletes for Trinidad and Tobago
World Athletics Championships medalists
Central American and Caribbean Games silver medalists for Trinidad and Tobago
Competitors at the 2018 Central American and Caribbean Games
Athletes (track and field) at the 2019 Pan American Games
Pan American Games competitors for Trinidad and Tobago
Central American and Caribbean Games medalists in athletics
Commonwealth Games competitors for Trinidad and Tobago
Olympic female sprinters